Roseau is the capital of Dominica.

Roseau, Roseaux or Rosseau may also refer to:

Roseau
 A type of common reed, or phragmite 
Roseau River (Dominica), the river that runs through the city
Roseau, Saint Lucia, a town on the island
Roseau Valley, in St. Lucia
Roseau River (Saint Lucia), a river in Saint Lucia
Roseau, Minnesota, a city in Roseau County, Minnesota, USA
Roseau Lake, a lake in Roseau County, Minnesota, USA
Roseau County, Minnesota
Roseau River Anishinabe First Nation, in Manitoba, Canada
Roseau River (Manitoba), a tributary of the Red River of the North in Manitoba and Minnesota

Roseaux
(plural of Roseau in French)
Roseaux, municipality in the Corail Arrondissement, in the Grand'Anse Department of Haiti
Roseaux (band), French music project
Roseaux (album), debut album of above band

Rosseau
Rosseau, Cavaellon, Haiti, a village in Haiti
Rosseau, Ohio, an unincorporated community
Rosseau, Ontario, a community in Ontario, Canada
Lake Rosseau, a lake in Ontario, Canada
Gail Rosseau, an American surgeon
Jacques Rosseau, a French canoeist